This is a list of museums in Bolivia.

Museums in La Paz

 National Museum of Archaeology (Bolivia)
 National Museum of Ethnography and Folklore
 Museo del Litoral Boliviano
 Museo de la Revolución Nacional
 Museo Tambo Quirquincho
 Casa de Murillo, La Paz
 Museo San Francisco Cultural Center 

 National Museum of Art, Bolivia
 Museum of Musical instruments
 Natural History Museum of Bolivia
 Coca Museum
 Museo de Metales Preciosos (Museo del Oro)
 Museo Costumbrista Juan de Vargas
 Bolivian Drink Museum

Museums in Sucre
 House of Liberty Museum
 Military Historical Museum of the Nation
 Enthography and Folklore Museum
 Museum of Indigenous art ASUR
 Para Ti Chocolate Museum

Museums in Cochabamba
 Museo Arqueologico de la Universidad (UMSS)
 Museo & Convento de Santa Teresa
 Casona de Mayorazgo (Lifestyle Museum & Heritage Mansion)
 Museo Villa Albina

Museums in other cities

 National Mint of Bolivia, Potosí (Casa de la Moneda de Bolivia)
 Art Museum of Antonio Paredes Candia, El Alto
 Museo del Litoral (Museo de la Guerra del Pacífico)
 Democratic and Cultural Revolution Museum, Orinoca
 Bolivian Air Force Museum, El Alto

See also 
 List of archives in Bolivia
 List of museums by country

External links 
Museos de Bolivia (Spanish) Viceministerio de culturas
Lonely Planet: Sights in Bolivia

Bolivia
 
Museums
Bolivia
Museums